Benjamin Dwight Allen (February 16, 1831, in Sturbridge, Massachusetts – March 4, 1914, in Wellesley, Massachusetts) was a composer and organist. His parents were natives of Massachusetts named Alvan and Lucy. He was an organist for Congregational churches and gained attention in the nineteenth century.

He was from 1845 teacher and organist, and from 1857 to 1894 organist and choir director, of the Union Congregational Church. In 1858 he founded the Worcester Music Festival. From 1871 to 1876 he taught at the Boston Conservatory. After 1894 he led the music department at a college in Wisconsin and from 1902 to 1905 he worked as an organist at the Manhattan Congregational Church in New York City.

References 

1831 births
1914 deaths
19th-century classical composers
19th-century organists
19th-century American composers
20th-century American composers
20th-century classical composers
20th-century organists
American classical organists
American male organists
American Congregationalists
American male classical composers
American Romantic composers
People from Sturbridge, Massachusetts
People from Wellesley, Massachusetts
Classical musicians from Massachusetts
20th-century American male musicians
19th-century American male musicians
Male classical organists